Pulo Gebang Bus Terminal is a type-A bus terminal at Cakung, in East Jakarta, Indonesia,  which is arguably the largest of its kind in Southeast Asia. The terminal was opened on 28 December 2016.

Pulo Gebang bus terminal has a land area of about 12.6 hectares with 4 building blocks. Each of the passenger terminal has four-story building with elevators, escalators, automatic doors, AC waiting rooms and surveillance cameras or CCTV. The terminal has dedicated area for food court, retail shop, mosque, car parking, health centre etc. It is connected with other terminals of Jakarta by TransJakarta feeder bus. Some of the feeder routes connecting the terminal operates 24 hours.

Facilities
Facilities available in Pulo Gebang bus terminal are:

 Mezzanine floor
Counters for intercity buses, Transjakarta bus stop, announcement room and other facilities.

 1st floor
Parking lots for intercity buses, cars, motorcycle and taxi parking, mosque, information room, cafeteria, mobile gas refueling station and public refueling station.

 2nd floor
Waiting room for passengers with facilities such as terminal post, health post, nursing room and phone recharging stand.

 3rd floor
Used as snacking center or food court and place for 54 stalls, as well astoilet room.

 4th floor
Office room for terminal management, representative for the bus companies (PO) and control room.

Other supporting facilities include:
 Health facility stand by for 24 hours
 Resting room for bus crew for 24 hour
 Fire extinguisher in every room
 Free Toilet
 Mosque with a capacity of roughly 700 people 
 Spacious parking area for cars and motorcycles
 62 CCTV in the terminal area
 Security post with police, military garrison, and municipal police (Satpol PP) in every side of the terminal.

Transjakarta routes
Starting 1 February 2017, Badan Pengelola Trans Jabodetabek (BPTJ) operates 4 new feeder routes from and to 4 terminals throughout Jakarta to Pulo Gebang terminal.
There are a total of 8 routes to Pulo Gebang terminal which are :
 Corridor 11 Kampung Melayu - Pulo Gebang
 Corridor 11A Pulo Gebang - Rawamangun
 Corridor 11D Pulogadung - Pulo Gebang via PIK
 Corridor 11E Lebak Bulus - Pulo Gebang
 Corridor 11F Pasar Minggu - Pulo Gebang
 Corridor 11H Pinang Ranti - Pulo Gebang
 Corridor 11Q Pulo Gebang - Kampung Melayu via East Flood Canal (Banjir Kanal Timur)
 Corridor B31 Pulo Gebang - Harapan Indah

See also

Cakung
TransJakarta

References

Transport in Jakarta
Bus stations in Indonesia
Buildings and structures in Jakarta
Post-independence architecture of Indonesia